James Bernett “Bunny” Chones (born November 30, 1949) is an American former professional basketball player, and current radio analyst for the Cleveland Cavaliers.

A 6'11" forward/center, Chones starred at Marquette University, where he earned All-America honors as a junior in 1972 after averaging 20.5 points and 11.9 rebounds per game.  When he left Marquette to pursue an ABA career, he was only the second player in NCAA history to leave school for professional basketball before his graduating year.  The New York Nets offered him a sizeable contract, and stipulated that he must accept within days and leave college.  As a result, he left Marquette in February 1972 with his college team undefeated and ranked second in the nation.  After Chones' departure Marquette finished the season at 25–4.

Professionally, he first played in the American Basketball Association (ABA) with the New York Nets, with whom he was an ABA All-Rookie First Team selection. He also spent a season with the Carolina Cougars. In 1975, he moved to the National Basketball Association, where he played five seasons with the Cleveland Cavaliers, and later won an NBA Championship as a member of the Los Angeles Lakers in 1980. He retired from basketball in 1982 with combined ABA/NBA totals of 9,821 points and 6,427 rebounds.

After retiring from the NBA, Chones spent eleven seasons as the television color analyst for the Cleveland Cavaliers, and in 2007, returned as a radio postgame analyst.

During the 2010–2011 season, usual Cavs radio voice Joe Tait missed much of the season as he recovered from surgery/illness. During that time,  Chones and WTAM morning co-host/sports director and Cavs pregame/postgame host Mike Snyder formed the interim radio play by play team.  Chones became a full-time member of the radio team in the 2011–2012 season, working with new play by play announcer John Michael.

Chones's daughter Kaayla is a former professional basketball player and as of 2019 is the director of player program for the Minnesota Timberwolves of the NBA.

Awards and honors

College
1972 First Team All-American
Marquette Hall of Fame Inductee (class of 2004)

Professional
1973 ABA All-Rookie First Team
1980 NBA Championship as a member of the Los Angeles Lakers
Greater Cleveland Sports Hall of Fame Inductee (class of 2002)

References

External links
Career statistics
Interview as member of 1979–80 NBA Champion Los Angeles Lakers
Jim Chones statistics at NBA.COM
Racine Native Chones to Fill in as Bucks Analyst

1949 births
Living people
African-American basketball players
All-American college men's basketball players
American expatriate basketball people in Italy
American men's basketball players
Basketball players at the 1971 Pan American Games
Basketball players from Wisconsin
Carolina Cougars players
Centers (basketball)
Cleveland Cavaliers announcers
Cleveland Cavaliers players
Los Angeles Lakers draft picks
Los Angeles Lakers players
Marquette Golden Eagles men's basketball players
New York Nets draft picks
New York Nets players
Pan American Games competitors for the United States
Parade High School All-Americans (boys' basketball)
Power forwards (basketball)
Sportspeople from Racine, Wisconsin
Sportspeople from the Milwaukee metropolitan area
Washington Bullets players
21st-century African-American people
20th-century African-American sportspeople